The 2011 Kazakhstan Cup was the 20th season of the Kazakhstan Cup, the annual nationwide football cup competition of Kazakhstan since the independence of the country. The competition began on 12 April 2011 and will end on a yet unknown date. Lokomotiv Astana were the defending champions, having won their first cup in the 2010 competition.

The winner of the competition will qualify for the first qualifying round of the 2012–13 UEFA Europa League.

Round 1 
The draw was conducted on 25 March 2010 at the offices of the Football Federation of Kazakhstan. Entering this round were 28 clubs from both the 2011 Premier League and First Division seasons. Both 2010 cup finalists, Lokomotiv Astana and Shakhter Karagandy, were given a bye to Round 2. The matches took place on 13 April 2011.

|}

Round 2 
Entering this round of the competition were the 14 winners from Round 1 and the two finalists from last year's cup competition, Lokomotiv Astana and Shakhter Karagandy. These matches took place on 20 April 2011.

|}

Quarterfinals 
Entering this round of the competition were the eight winners from Round 2. These matches took place on 11 May 2011.

Semifinals

Final

External links 
 Official site

References 

2011
Cup
2011 domestic association football cups